General Order No. 1 (Japanese:一般命令第一号) for the surrender of Japan was prepared by the United States Joint Chiefs of Staff and approved by President Harry Truman on August 17, 1945.

It was issued by General Douglas MacArthur to the representative of the Empire of Japan following the surrender of Japan, and then issued by Japanese Imperial General Headquarters to the forces of the Empire of Japan on 2 September 1945. It instructed Japanese forces to surrender to designated Allied commanders, reveal all current military deployments, and preserve military equipment for later disarmament. It also specified the occupation of Japan and Japanese-controlled areas by forces of the Allied Powers.

It also had the effect of leading to the eventual division of Korea at the 38th Parallel in that Japanese forces to the north of this parallel were ordered to surrender to the Commander in Chief of Soviet Forces in the Far East, and those to the south were directed to surrender to the Commander in Chief, U.S. Army Forces in the Pacific, in accordance with Section 1, paragraphs (b) and (e), respectively.

See also
Cairo Declaration (27 November 1943)
Potsdam Declaration (26 July 1945)
Hirohito surrender broadcast (15 August 1945)
Gwangbokjeol (15 August 1945)
Japanese Instrument of Surrender (2 September 1945)
Retrocession Day (25 October 1945)
Treaty of San Francisco (8 September 1951)

References

Bibliography

External links
 GENERAL ORDER NO.IMinistry of Foreign Affairs of Japan
 SCAPIN-1: GENERAL ORDER NO. 1 (DIRECTIVE NO. 1), OFFICE OF THE SUPREME COMMANDER FOR THE ALLIED POWERS 1945/09/02 , Scap Directives to the Imperial Japanese Government Volume 1
 END OF EMPIRE: General Order No.1

General orders
Aftermath of World War II in Japan
History of North Korea
History of South Korea
Taiwan under Republic of China rule
1945 in North Korea
1945 in South Korea
1945 in Taiwan
1945 documents